The men's 200 metre individual medley competition at the 1997 Pan Pacific Swimming Championships took place on August 13 at the NISHI Civic Pool.  The last champion was Tom Dolan of US.

This race consisted of four lengths of the pool, one each in backstroke, breaststroke, butterfly and freestyle swimming.

Records
Prior to this competition, the existing world and Pan Pacific records were as follows:

Results
All times are in minutes and seconds.

Heats
The first round was held on August 13.

B Final
The B final was held on August 13.

A Final
The A final was held on August 13.

References

1997 Pan Pacific Swimming Championships